Vesna Teršelič (born in 1962) is a peace activist who founded the Anti-War Campaign of Croatia. In 1998, she was joint recipient of the Right Livelihood Award along with Katarina Kruhonja of the Centre for Peace, Non-violence and Human Rights, Osijek.

Biography
Teršelič, an ethnic Slovene born in Ljubljana, lives in Zagreb, where she works as a peace activist.

Vesna Teršelič, together with other her friends, organized the Croatian Anti-War Campaign in 1991 to prevent war conflicts on the territories of the former Yugoslavia. As Teršelič said: "We initiated the anti-war [campaign] on July 4, 1991, which means that we did it too late, because the whole previous year... passed in hope that surely the politicians were doing something in order to reach an agreement in a diplomatic way, reaching a new form of arrangement between Croats and Serbs in Croatia." They also launched the magazine Arkzin in September 1991 to campaign for peace and research war conflict aspects. 

She became director of Documenta - Center for Dealing with the Past.

In 2017, Teršelič signed the Declaration on the Common Language of the Croats, Serbs, Bosniaks and Montenegrins.

References

External links
  "Vježbanje nasilja, vježbanje samouništenja" — an interview with Vesna Teršelič in Zarez 66

1962 births
Living people
People from Ljubljana
People from Zagreb
Croatian people of Slovenian descent
Croatian activists
Signatories of the Declaration on the Common Language